Ocheon is a town, or eup in Nam-gu, Pohang, North Gyeongsang Province, South Korea. The township Ocheon-myeon was upgraded to the town Ocheon-eup in 1980. Ocheon Town Office is located in Mundeok-ri.

Communities
Ocheon-eup is divided into 11 villages (ri).

References

External links
Official website 

Pohang
Towns and townships in North Gyeongsang Province